Pampus argenteus, the silver pomfret or white pomfret, is a species of butterfish that lives in the Indo-West Pacific, spanning the coastal waters of the Middle East, Eastern Africa, South Asia, Southeast Asia, and East Asia.  The species has been reported only twice, one hundred years apart, from the central Mediterranean Sea.

Silver pomfrets are usually silver/white in color, with few small scales. They can grow up to a range of 4–6 kg (8–13 lb). However, due to overfishing, specimens weighing less than 1 kg (2 lb) are more commonly seen.

The silver pomfret should not be mistaken for the Florida pompano (Trachinotus carolinus), which is a jackfish found off the coast of Florida in the Gulf of Mexico, and neither should be confused with true pomfrets, which are of the family Bramidae.

As food 

This fish is prized in the Indo-Asia-Pacific region for its taste. Its flesh is soft and buttery when cooked. It is called  in Arabic, which is derived from the word , meaning 'butter', due to its tender flesh.

It is also a popular dish in Chinese cuisine, where it is called  and is often served steamed or braised.

Pomfret is especially popular in Kuwait, and it is one of the most expensive types of fish in the market, with the Kuwaiti Pomfret, caught in the waters of Kuwait, being the most sought-after followed by the Iranian Pomfret. The Kuwaiti government regularly bans the fishing of the Kuwaiti type to allow the fish to reproduce. Mtabbag Zbedi is a popular Kuwaiti dish made with fried Pomfret, spices, and rice, with daqqūs, Kuwaiti home-made hot sauce, usually added.

References

Stromateidae
Commercial fish
Marine fauna of South Asia
Marine fish of Southeast Asia
Fish described in 1788
Taxobox binomials not recognized by IUCN